Don Shanks (born 2 October 1952) is an English professional football manager and former footballer born in Hammersmith, London, who currently manages Egyptian fourth division team Makadi F.C. He played in the Football League as a full back for Luton Town, Queens Park Rangers, Brighton & Hove Albion and Wimbledon, before moving into non-league football with Wealdstone.

Shanks began his football career as a junior at Fulham, but moved on to Luton Town without appearing in Fulham's first team. He joined QPR in November 1974 and made his debut against Burnley in December 1974. He eventually played 180 league games for QPR, scoring 10 times, before transferring to Brighton in 1981, and playing one game on a non-contract basis for Wimbledon.

He is also known for being Stan Bowles' gambling partner and for dating Mary Stavin, the 1977 Miss World.

References

1952 births
Living people
Footballers from Hammersmith
English footballers
Association football fullbacks
Fulham F.C. players
Luton Town F.C. players
Brighton & Hove Albion F.C. players
Wimbledon F.C. players
Wealdstone F.C. players
English Football League players
Queens Park Rangers F.C. players